The Big South–OVC football is an association of football members of the Big South Conference and Ohio Valley Conference (OVC). The Big South–OVC will cover the midwestern, southern, and Northeast U.S. with member institutions located in Illinois, Missouri, North Carolina, Pennsylvania, Rhode Island, South Carolina, and Tennessee.

History

Big South Conference
In the 2021–22 season, the Big South Conference was made up of nine football-playing members including full members Campbell University, Charleston Southern University, Gardner-Webb University, Hampton University, and North Carolina A&T State University, and associate members Kennesaw State University, Monmouth University, University of North Alabama, and Robert Morris University. The following changes occurred dwindling the football membership from nine members in 2021 to four members by 2023, dropping below the minimum of six members required for an automatic bid for the NCAA Division I FCS Playoffs.

 On January 29, 2021, the ASUN Conference announced its intent of sponsoring football in the Football Championship Subdivision (FCS) for the 2022. The new league lead to the departure of Kennesaw State University and University of North Alabama after the 2021 season.

 On January 25, 2022, the Colonial Athletic Association announced that Hampton University and Monmouth University would join that conference on July 1, 2022. 

 On February 22, 2022, the CAA also announced that North Carolina A&T State University would be leaving the Big South, joining CAA Football on July 1, 2023. 

 On March 29, 2022, Bryant University announced as a new football-only member effective with the 2022 season. 

 On August 3, 2022, Campbell University announced that it will join the CAA in 2023 as well.

Ohio Valley Conference
The Ohio Valley Conference also dropped below the number of eligible teams required for an automatic bid for the NCAA Division I FCS Playoffs between the 2021 and 2023 seasons. In the 2021 season, the OVC included Austin Peay University, Eastern Illinois University, Murray State University, Southeast Missouri State University, University of Tennessee, Martin, Tennessee State University, and Tennessee Tech University. The following changes occurred to lower eligible football-playing members from seven to five by 2023.

On September 17, 2021, Austin Peay University left for the ASUN Conference, which ultimately launched its own football league in 2022.

On January 7, 2022, Murray State University announced its intent to leave the OVC, left for the Missouri Valley Conference and Missouri Valley Football Conference. In a separate statement, Murray State's president indicated that the football team would remain in the OVC in the 2022 season, ensuring that the OVC would retain its automatic bid to the FCS playoffs in that season and giving the league more time to add new football members. Murray State would eventually be accepted by the MVFC effective in 2023.

On February 23, 2022, the OVC added Lindenwood University, transitioning from D-II. Lindenwood will not be eligible for the postseason until the 2026–27 season, therefore it will not count towards the football membership for the automatic qualifying bid for the FCS playoffs until them.

Merger
On February 22, the conference announced its intent to combine its football membership with the Ohio Valley Conference beginning in 2023. With the release of the 2023 joint football schedule, it was announced that the partnership between the two conferences would exist through the 2026–27 season.

The members of the merger will include Bryant University, Charleston Southern University, Eastern Illinois University, Gardner-Webb University, Lindenwood University, Robert Morris University, Southeast Missouri State University, University of Tennessee, Martin, Tennessee State University, and Tennessee Tech University.

Member schools

Inaugural members

Notes

Membership timeline

References

 
 
Sports in the Midwestern United States
Sports in the Southern United States
Articles which contain graphical timelines